Skara HF is a handball club in Skara, Sweden, established on 8 April 1993 when Hangelösa HF and Stenums IF merged their handball sections. The women's team plays in the Swedish top division since the late 1990s.

References

External links
 Official website 
 

1993 establishments in Sweden
Sport in Västra Götaland County
Handball clubs established in 1993
Swedish handball clubs